太極 may refer to:
Chinese Taiji (philosophy)
Korean Taegeuk

See also
 Taiji (disambiguation)